The title Dream Hunter or collectively Dream Hunters may refer to one of two anime series debuting in 1985:
 Dream Hunter Rem starring Rem Ayanokōji, debuting June 10, with six OVAs produced in total by 1992
 Dream Hunter Fandora by Go Nagai, debuting September 21, with three OVAs produced in total by 1986

Or also:
 The Sandman: The Dream Hunters by Neil Gaiman.